Panepistimio is a station on Athens Metro Line 2. It opened on 28 January 2000, and is adjacent to the National Library of Greece, the National and Kapodistrian University of Athens and the Academy of Athens.  "Panepistimio" means "university" in Greek.

History

The earliest proposal for a metro station at Panepistimio was by Alexandros Verdelis of the Greek Engineers Association in 1925, where it was known as Theatrou (. Subsequent proposals included the station under various names, such as Akadimia.

Future

When Line 4 of Athens Metro is completed, the station will have an underpass connection with "Akademia" Station.

References

Athens Metro stations
Railway stations opened in 2000
2000 establishments in Greece
Railway stations at university and college campuses